Four-leaf clover is a rare variation of the common three-leaf clover (genus Trifolium).

Four-leaf clover may also refer to:

Other plants
Oxalis tetraphylla, sometimes known informally as "lucky clover" and "four-leaf clover" 
Marsilea, aquatic ferns, common names include water clover and four-leaf clover
 Marsilea quadrifolia

Music
 Four Leaf Clover Records, a Swedish record company and independent label established by musician, bandleader and producer Lars Samuelson in the early 1970's
 Four Leaf Clover, a 2009 album by Four Celtic Voices and Erin Hill
 Four Leaf Clover, a 2007 album by Li Yifeng
 "The Four Leaf Clover", a song by Charles Whitney Coombs (1859–1940)
 "Four Leaf Clover", a 1997 song by Abra Moore
 "4 Leaf Clover", a song by Erykah Badu from the 1997 album Baduizm
 "Four Leaf Clover", a song by Second Person from the 2011 album Come to Dust
 "Four-leaf Clover", a song by Twice from the 2021 album Perfect World
 "Four Leaf Clover", a song by Catherine from the 1996 album Hot Saki & Bedtime Stories
 "Four Leaf Clover", a 2017 song by Christian Hudson
 "Four Leaf Clover", a song by The Kooks from the 2018 album Let's Go Sunshine
 "Four Leaf Clover", a song by The Badlees from the 2002 album Renew
 "Four Leaf Clover", a song by Diana Vickers from the 2010 album Songs from the Tainted Cherry Tree
 "Four-Leaf Clover", a song by Winger from the 2006 album IV
 "Four Leaf Clover", a song by Destine from the 2012 album Illuminate
 "Four Leaf Clover", a song by Badly Drawn Boy from the 2004 album One Plus One Is One
 "Four Leaf Clover", a 2006 song by Mellowdrone
 "4 Leaf Clover", a song by Old 97's from the 1994 album Hitchhike to Rhome

Other uses
 "Four-Leaf Clover", an episode of A Love So Beautiful (2020 TV series)
 "The Four-Leaf Clover" (1990), a short story by Isaac Asimov from the 1990 collection Puzzles of the Black Widowers

See also 

 Quatrefoil ('four-leafed')
 "I'm Looking Over a Four Leaf Clover", a song from 1927
 Fourth United States Army, whose shoulder sleeve insignia is a four-leaf clover